Do or Die is a 1921 American film serial directed by J. P. McGowan. The film is considered to be lost. The film serial had a working title of The Seal of Satan. Several of its scenes where filmed at the Morro Castle in Havana, Cuba.

Cast
 Eddie Polo as Jack Merton
 Magda Lane as The Mystery Woman
 Inez McDonald as Dolores Nunez
 J. P. McGowan as Captain Alvarez / Satan
 Jay Marchant as Mendez
 Jean Perkins as Rafael

Chapters
 The Buccaneer's Bride
 The Hornet's Nest
 The Secret of the Sea
 The Hidden Danger
 The Bandit's Victim
 The Escape
 In Hiding
 The Trap
 Under Sentence
 The Secret Cavern
 Satan's Twin
 The Lost Ring
 The Cipher Key
 The Midnight Attack
 The Race for Life
 The Crystal Lake
 A Fight to the Finish
 Hidden Treasure

See also
 List of American films of 1921
 List of film serials
 List of film serials by studio

References

External links

 Do or Die - Eddie Polo - Universal Weekly - 47 pages of details

1921 films
1920s action thriller films
1921 lost films
American silent serial films
American black-and-white films
Lost American films
Films directed by J. P. McGowan
American action thriller films
Films shot in Cuba
Treasure hunt films
Universal Pictures film serials
1920s American films
Silent adventure films
Silent thriller films